Vladimir Borisovich Kuzmin ( born 31 May 1955) is a Russian rock singer, guitarist, and songwriter.

Biography 
Kuzmin is the son of Boris Kuzmin, a  naval officer, and Natalya Kuzmina,  a Russian language and literature teacher. When he was young boy, Kuzmin played violin in musical school. He wrote his first song when he was six years old. He learned to play guitar on his own. He organized his first band, Aelita, in the 6th grade. Two years later, on school evenings, he performed songs of The Beatles, The Rolling Stones, Creedence Clearwater Revival, Jimi Hendrix and Led Zeppelin along with his own material.

Career
Then Kuzmin earned a degree in a musical college, became a lead guitarist of professional VIA bands Nadejda (1977 - 1978) and Samotsvety (1978 - 1979). Producer of Samotsvety Yuri Malikov remembered that Kuzmin arranged some songs. But, in 1979, together with vocalist and guitarist of Vesiolie Rebiata Alexander Barykin, Kuzmin organized rock band Carnaval.

In 1981 Carnaval have been released EP on main Soviet firm of musical records Melodiya and debut album The Superman. In Carnaval Kuzmin has brightly proved himself as a rock guitarist and also as a composer, arranger, vocalist.

He played on keyboards, violin and flute too.

In 1982 Kuzmin organized new band called Dinamik. He remained a friend of Alexander Barykin. 

Kuzmin toured USA under the direction of American promoter Scott Pedersen / JazzConcerts.com in 1989 with Dinamik. American singer-songwriter Michael Bolton said: «Vladimir Kuzmin is a super-talented musician, I’ve ever known in my life. By the way, we've hanged out down in Moscow in 1988 and I wrote a beautiful song together. Actually, I send a letter to him, but I had no answer. He’s my Russian brother. Let him know.»

Discography 

With band Carnaval:

 Sudden Impasse (music by Vladimir Kuzmin, lyrics by Igor Kokhanovsky) 
 
 Now I Know (music by Alexander Barykin and Vladimir Kuzmin, lyrics by Igor Kokhanovsky)

Personnel
Vladimir Kuzmin (ex-Nadejda, ex-Samotsvety), lead vocals (2), lead guitar, keyboards, violin, flute, vocoder (2), backing vocals (1, 3)
Alexander Barykin, lead vocals (1, 3), rhythm guitar, acoustic guitar,  backing vocals (2)
Evgeny Kazantsev (ex-Vesiolie Rebiata, ex-Samotsvety), bass, backing vocals
Vladimir Boldyrev (ex-Modo), drums

 1981 — Супермен (Superman) 
With the band "Dynamic":
 1982 — Том 1 (Volume One)
 1982 — Том 2 (Volume Two)
 1983 — Возьми с собой (Take Me With You)
 1984 — Чудо-сновидения (Magic Of Dream)
 1985 — Голос (Voice, the single)
 1986 — Моя любовь (My Love)
 1986 — Пока не пришёл понедельник (Til' Monday Comes)
 1987 — Ромео и Джульетта (Romeo and Juliet)
 1988 — Смотри на меня сегодня (Take a Look At Me Today)
 1989 — Слёзы в огне (Tears On Fire)
 1991 — Dirty Sounds (Грязный Саунд)
 1992 — Crazy About Rock’n’Roll (Помешан На Рокнроле)
 1992 — Моя подруга Удача (My Friend - Luck)
 1994 — Небесное притяжение (Heavenly Gravity)
 1996 — Семь морей (Seven Seas)
 1997 — Две звезды (Two Stars)
 1997 — Грешный ангел (Sinful Angel)
 1999 — Наши лучшие дни (Our Best Days)
 2000 — Сети (Networks)
 2001 — Рокер (Rocker)
 2002 — Рокер 2 (Rocker 2)
 2003 — О чём-то лучшем (About Something Better)
 2006 — Святой ручей (Saint Creek)
 2007 — Тайна (Secret)

References

External links
 Official Website of Vladimir Kuzmin (in Russian)
 

1955 births
Living people
Russian rock musicians
Musicians from Moscow
Winners of the Golden Gramophone Award
20th-century Russian singers
21st-century Russian singers